Ağlı District is a district of the Kastamonu Province of Turkey. Its seat is the town of Ağlı. Its area is 225 km2, and its population is 3,006 (2021). According to the Law No. 3644, which entered into force on 20 May 1990, it became a district.

Composition
There is one municipality in Ağlı District:
 Ağlı

There are 13 villages in Ağlı District:

 Adalar
 Akçakese
 Akdivan
 Bereketli
 Fırıncık
 Gölcüğez
 Kabacı
 Müsellimler
 Oluközü
 Selmanlı
 Tunuslar
 Turnacık
 Yeşilpınar

References

Districts of Kastamonu Province